Lu'an railway station is a railway station in Lu'an, Anhui, China.

History
The station opened in 2004. Construction on a new, larger station building began on 10 September 2016. On 16 August 2018, the refurbished station was opened.

References 

Railway stations in Anhui
Railway stations in China opened in 2004